The canton of Gif-sur-Yvette is an administrative division of the Essonne department, Île-de-France region, northern France. Its borders were modified at the French canton reorganisation which came into effect in March 2015. Its seat is in Gif-sur-Yvette.

It consists of the following communes:

Bièvres
Boullay-les-Troux
Bures-sur-Yvette
Gif-sur-Yvette
Gometz-la-Ville
Les Molières
Pecqueuse
Saclay
Saint-Aubin
Vauhallan
Verrières-le-Buisson
Villiers-le-Bâcle

References

Cantons of Essonne